Knock for Knock is a 1976 television film, written and directed by Mike Leigh and broadcast on the BBC. The film stars Sam Kelly and Anthony O'Donnell. After broadcast, the tape was wiped and no copies are believed to exist.

Plot
The film concerns a man called Mr. Purvis (O'Donnell) trying to arrange car insurance after he has been convicted of drunk driving. Kelly plays Mr. Bowes, the deranged insurance broker.

Production
Like Leigh's previous film The Permissive Society, Knock for Knock was produced by BBC Birmingham as part of their Second City Firsts strand. In an online Q&A for The Guardian in 2000, Leigh said it was 'experimental for the time' as it was recorded in one take with multiple cameras. The tape was wiped by the BBC after broadcast and no copies are believed to exist. According to Leigh, it was 'wiped by a crackpot committee because of a "shortage of space".' He went on to say he would pay 'good money' if anyone could find a copy.

Cast
 Sam Kelly as Mr. Bowes
 Anthony O'Donnell as Mr. Purvis
 Meryl Hampton as Marilyn

Critical reception
The film received a very positive review by Time Out who said it was 'the funniest thing on the box for months' and that Kelly gave the performance of the decade. Leigh himself described Kelly's performance as 'incredible and hilarious'.

References

External links

1976 television films
1976 films
Films directed by Mike Leigh
British television films
1970s English-language films